Nichane (meaning Direct in Moroccan Arabic and Berber:نيشان) (formerly Aljareeda Alokhra) was a Moroccan weekly arabophone and darijophone (in Moroccan Arabic) news magazine.

History and profile
Nichane was published from September 2006 to October 2010. Its editor-in-chief was Driss Ksikes.

The magazine was a sister publication of the French-language Tel Quel magazine and was based in Casablanca.

Censorship

On 20 December 2006, then Moroccan Prime Minister Driss Jettou issued a statement prohibiting thus the diffusion and distribution of Nichane.  This prohibition came as a result of the publishing of "provocative jokes" related to religion, and the late King of Morocco, Hassan II.

Driss Ksikes and another journalist, Sanaa El Aji, were prosecuted for "defaming Islam and damaging morality" and sentenced to fines of 80,000 dirhams each and three-year suspended sentences.  Additionally, the magazine was banned for two months. Both journalists defended their article.

In December 2009, police destroyed 100,000 copies of the magazine after it printed an unauthorized opinion poll of Moroccan King Mohammed VI.

In October 2010, publisher Ahmed Benchemsi announced the closure of the magazine, citing an advertiser boycott by royally-owned ONA/SNI holding group.

References

External links
  Nichane

2006 establishments in Morocco
2010 disestablishments in Morocco
Arabic-language magazines
Censorship in Morocco
Defunct magazines published in Morocco
Magazines established in 2006
Magazines disestablished in 2010
Mass media in Casablanca
News magazines published in Africa
Weekly news magazines
Banned magazines